John Barr (born 1982) is a Scottish international shinty player from Abriachan, Scotland.  He presently plays for Glenurquhart Shinty Club.

History
Barr attended Charleston Academy in Inverness.  He was instrumental in the rise of Robert Gordon University as a force in University Shinty. He has represented Scotland at all levels of shinty, most recently in 2009.

He is one of few shinty players to have his own chant, in tribute to his physically dominant style of play. The chant "John Barr ate my car" is a favourite at games where he is playing.

Other sports
Barr is a rugby union player in the closed season and plays for Highland RFC in Inverness.

He was the first shinty player to receive a Universities Hurling All Star honour in 2006 after playing for British Universities GAA.

References

1982 births
Living people
Shinty players
Sportspeople from Inverness
Scottish rugby union players
Scottish hurlers
Rugby union players from Inverness
Highland RFC players